Muricholic acids are a group of bile acids found as one of the main forms in mice, which gives them their name, and at low concentrations in other species. Muricholic acids differ from the primary bile acids found in humans, cholic acid and chenodeoxycholic acid, by having a hydroxyl group in the β- configuration at the 6-position. The orientation of the hydroxyl group at the 7 position defines α- or β-muricholic acid. Muricholic acids are detectable at low concentrations in human urine.

The three major bile acids in germ-free mice are cholic acid, α-muricholic, and β-muricholic acids. In conventional mice with a normal microbiome, ω-muricholic acid, and various sulfated forms are also found. Conjugation with taurine (to give tauromuricholic acids which are the main forms), or with glycine (to give glycomuricholic acids) takes place in the liver before secretion.

The enzyme responsible for the 6-hydroxylation reactions forming muricholates in rodents is the cytochrome P450 Cyp2c70. This produces α-muricholic acid from chenodeoxycholic acid, and β-muricholic acid from ursodeoxycholic acid.

Tauromuricholic acids were shown to be potent antagonists of the bile acid receptor farnesoid X receptor (FXR).

Chemical structures

References

Bile acids
Cholanes